The juniper (Juniperus) is a type of shrub and tree in the cypress family.

Juniper may also refer to:

Places

Canada
Juniper, New Brunswick, a hamlet
Juniper Lake (Nova Scotia), several lakes in Nova Scotia
Juniper Island, Ontario

England
Juniper, Northumberland, a hamlet

United States
Juniper, Georgia, an unincorporated community
Juniper Cove, Salem, Massachusetts
Fort Juniper, a fort that existed from 1775 in Salem, Massachusetts
Juniper, a place in Munising Township, Michigan
 Juniper Springs, Nevada, also called Juniper, a former mining camp
Juniper Island (Lake Champlain), Vermont
Juniper Lake (Lassen Peak), Lassen Volcanic National Park, California
Juniper Springs, a natural spring in Ocala National Forest, Florida
Juniper Swamp, Middle Village, Queens, New York City, filled in c. 1915

Arts and entertainment
Junior Juniper, a Marvel Comics character
Juniper (band), an Irish rock band (1991–1998)
The Junipers, an English psychedelic pop band (2000–2013)
Juniper (film), a 2021 New Zealand comedy-drama 
Juniper, a young adult novel by Monica Furlong

Businesses
Juniper Networks, a networking equipment company based in Sunnyvale, California, United States
Juniper Bank, a credit card issuer owned by Barclays plc based in Delaware, United States
Juniper Publishers, a publisher of academic journals based in Hyderabad, India

Maritime vessels
HMT Juniper (T123), a Second World War Royal Navy minesweeping trawler
, a Union Navy steamer during the American Civil War
Juniper-class USCG seagoing buoy tender
USCGC Juniper (WLB-201), a United States Coast Guard buoy tender
Juniper (trimaran), a trimaran sailboat designed by Chris White Designs and sailed around the world by Henk de Velde

People and fictional characters
Juniper (given name), a given name (including a list of people and fictional characters with the given name or variants)
Robert Juniper (1929–2012), Australian artist
Tony Juniper (born 1960), British environmentalist and author

Other uses
Alstom Coradia Juniper, a family of trains used on the British railway network
Juniper Airport, a private airport near Juniper, New Brunswick, Canada
Juniper, a codename for the AMD/ATI R800 graphic processor

See also
 Juniper berry, the fruit of the juniper